Trachemys dorbigni dorbigni, also known as the Southern D'Orbigny's slider or simply Orbigny's slider, is a relative of the pond slider.

Appearance
The shell of Orbigny's slider is an elongated oval, up to 26.7 cm in length.  Females have a distinct dome.  Males have a moderate dome.  The general color is a brownish-green shade with markings of red, orange, or yellow on each scute.  The skin is also brownish green.

Habitat
Orbigny's slider is found in Brazil, primarily along Rio Guaiba drainage area.  It is often found throughout Uruguay and drainages in northeastern Argentina.  This species appears to prefer waters with slow to moderate currents.

References

Trachemys
Taxa named by André Marie Constant Duméril
Taxa named by Gabriel Bibron